Finest Hour: The Best of Gavin DeGraw is a compilation album by American singer-songwriter Gavin DeGraw, released on October 17, 2014 by RCA Records. It contains songs from all his studio albums except Free (2009). It also includes the two new tracks "You Got Me" and "Fire". According to the press release a new song titled "Not Our Fault", written by DeGraw, Jake Gosling, Chris Leonard, and Harry Styles, was intended to be included on the album but did not make the final track listing.

Track listing

Notes
 signifies an additional producer
 signifies a vocal producer

Charts

Personnel
Smith Carlson - Engineer

References

2014 albums
Gavin DeGraw albums
RCA Records albums
Albums produced by Max Martin
Albums produced by Mark Endert
Albums produced by Ryan Tedder
Albums produced by Butch Walker
Albums produced by Johan Carlsson